FMFC may refer to:

 Forres Mechanics F.C., a Scottish association football club
 Forward Madison FC, an American association football club